Jorma Kalevi Katrama (5 June 1936 – 2 January 2022) was a Finnish instrumentalist who specialized in violin and double bass. Katrama died on 2 January 2022, at the age of 85.

Solo albums 
Contrabasso con amore FINLANDIA RECORDS (Warner) 4509-95605-2
Contrabasso con bravura 4509-97894-2
Contrabasso con sentimento 4509-97894-2
Contrabasso concertante 3984-21450-2
Contrabass!  Warner Korea 3984-21355-2
Le charme de la contrebasse ERATO 39842-27082

References

External links
http://www.concertartist.info/bio/KAT001.html 
 

1936 births
2022 deaths
Classical double-bassists
21st-century Finnish male musicians
21st-century double-bassists
Musicians from Helsinki
21st-century classical musicians
20th-century Finnish male musicians
20th-century double-bassists
Finnish classical musicians
Finnish double-bassists
Male double-bassists